Lancelot Oduwa Imasuen (born 20 June 1971) is a Nigerian film director and film producer.

Career
Imasuen has worked in the film industry since 1995, mainly as a film director and producer. He currently lives in Lagos.

His films feature unexplored aspects of the African experience including tribalism, witchcraft, crime, poverty, religion, and folk beliefs.

Imasuen has plans to commence filming an epic movie titled Nogbaisi Ovonramwen in 2013. It will be about the last Oba of Benin.

Nollywood Babylon
In 2008, a Canadian documentary, Nollywood Babylon, co-directed by Ben Addelman and Samir Mallal, and produced by AM Pictures and the National Film Board of Canada in association with the Documentary Channel, followed Lancelot Oduwa Imasuen while he was shooting his 157th film Bent Arrows.

The documentary played in the Official Competition at the Sundance Film Festival in January 2009. Bent Arrows was released into the Nigerian home market in 2010.

Selected filmography
 The Soul That Sinneth (1999)
 The Last Burial (2000)
 Private Sin (2003)
 Enslaved (2004)
 Moment of Truth (2005)
 Games Men Play (2006)
 Yahoo Millionaire (2007)
 Sister's Love (2008)
 Entanglement (2009)
 Home in Exile (2010)
 Bent Arrows (2010)
 Adesuwa (2012)
 Invasion 1897 (2014)
 ABCs of Death 2 (Segment L is for Legacy) (2014)
 "ATM (Authentic Tentative Marriage)" (2016)
Enakhe (2020)
Gbege

Awards and nominations

See also
 List of Nigerian film producers

References

External links
 
 
 

Nigerian film directors
Nigerian film producers
Nigerian screenwriters
Living people
1971 births
Nigerian film award winners
Nigerian documentary filmmakers